The Crane is a resort hotel in Saint Philip in Barbados. Opened in 1887, it is reportedly the oldest continuously operating resort in the Caribbean.

References

External links
 The Crane Official Website 

Populated places in Barbados
Saint Philip, Barbados
Hotels in Barbados
Hotels established in 1887